Lycée Jules Verne (LJV) or Lycée français Jules-Verne may refer to:

Schools in France:
  in Nantes
 Lycée Jules-Verne (Sartrouville)
 Lycée Jules-Verne - Cergy-le-Haut

Schools outside of France:
 Lycée Jules Verne (South Africa) in Johannesburg, South Africa
 Lycée français Jules Verne (Guatemala) near Guatemala City
 Lycée Français de Tenerife "Jules Verne"
 École secondaire Jules-Verne in Vancouver, British Columbia, Canada